The 2018–19 Duke Blue Devils men's basketball team represented Duke University during the 2018–19 NCAA Division I men's basketball season. They were coached by 39th-year head coach, Mike Krzyzewski. The Blue Devils played their home games at Cameron Indoor Stadium in Durham, North Carolina as a member of the Atlantic Coast Conference. Led by tournament MVP Zion Williamson, they won Duke's 21st ACC tournament title. They received the ACC's automatic bid to the NCAA tournament and reached the Elite Eight, where they lost 68–67 to Michigan State.  Duke finished as 2018-19 RPI National Champions for finishing #1 in final RPI Rankings.

Previous season
The Blue Devils finished the 2017–18 season 29–8, 13–5 in ACC play to finish in second place. They defeated Notre Dame in the quarterfinals of the ACC tournament before losing to North Carolina in the semifinals. They received an at-large bid to the NCAA tournament as the No. 2 seed in the Midwest region. There they defeated Iona, Rhode Island, and Syracuse to advance to the Elite Eight. In the Elite Eight, they lost to No. 1 seed Kansas in overtime.

Offseason

Departures

2018 recruiting class

Roster

Depth chart

Schedule and results

Source:

|-
!colspan=12 style=| Duke Canada Tour

|-
!colspan=12 style=| Exhibition

|-
!colspan=12 style=| Non-conference regular season

|-
!colspan=12 style=| ACC regular season

|-
!colspan=12 style=| ACC Tournament

|-
!colspan=12 style=| NCAA tournament

 Record for the largest on-campus attendance in college basketball history.

Ranking movement

^Coaches did not release a Week 2 poll.
*AP does not release post-NCAA Tournament rankings

References

Duke
Duke Blue Devils men's basketball seasons
2018 in sports in North Carolina
Duke